Yingfeng Subdistrict is a subdistrict on the eastern portion of Fangshan District, Beijing, China. It shares border with Xiangyang Subdistrict in the north, Chengguan Subdistrict in the other three directions, and an exclave of Yingfeng borders Zhoukoudian Town in the west. Its population was 34,721 as of 2020.

The subdistrict was formed in 1983 after separating from Xiangyang Subdistrict. Its name Yingfeng originated from a slope of the south of the region.

Administrative Divisions 
As of 2021, Yingfeng Subdistrict had direct jurisdiction over the following 11 communities:

See also 
 List of township-level divisions of Beijing

References 

Fangshan District
Subdistricts of Beijing